The Joe Emmer House was a historic house in rural northern White County, Arkansas.  It was located on County Road 47, northwest of the Holly Springs Church.  It was a single-story single-pen log structure, with a side gable roof and a shed-roof porch across the front.  The logs were hand-hewn and joined by dovetailed notches.  A frame addition extended the building to the west.  The house was built c. 1890, and was one of about thirty such houses remaining in the county.

The house was listed on the National Register of Historic Places in 1992.  It has been listed as destroyed in the Arkansas Historic Preservation Program database.

See also
National Register of Historic Places listings in White County, Arkansas

References

Houses on the National Register of Historic Places in Arkansas
Houses completed in 1890
Houses in White County, Arkansas
National Register of Historic Places in White County, Arkansas
1890 establishments in Arkansas
Log houses in the United States
Former buildings and structures in Arkansas
Log buildings and structures on the National Register of Historic Places in Arkansas